Felter is a surname. Notable people with the surname Felter include:

Harvey Wickes Felter (1865–1927), American physician 
June Felter (1919–2019), American painter and illustrator 
Marlon Felter (born 1978), Surinamese footballer

See also
Felt (disambiguation)